Harald Wydra is a university lecturer in politics at the University of Cambridge and a Fellow of St Catharine's College, Cambridge. His general research interests include political anthropology, symbolic politics, politics of memory, and methodological approaches to the understanding of uncertainty in politics. He is a founding editor-in-chief of the academic journal International Political Anthropology.

Wydra is the author of the 2007 book Communism and the Emergence of Democracy and edited Breaking Boundaries: Varieties of Liminality (Berghahn, Oxford, 2013) with Agnes Horvath and Bjorn Thomassen.

References

External links
 Staff Profile at the Cambridge University website
 Staff Profile at the St. Catharine's College website

Living people
British anthropologists
Fellows of St Catharine's College, Cambridge
Year of birth missing (living people)